Rehfelde station is a railway station in the municipality of Rehfelde in the Märkisch-Oderland district of Brandenburg. It is served by the line .

References

Railway stations in Brandenburg
Railway stations in Germany opened in 1874
1874 establishments in Prussia
Buildings and structures in Märkisch-Oderland